Constitution of 1997 may refer to:

Constitution of Fiji of 1997
Constitution of Poland of 1997
Constitution of Thailand of 1997
Constitution of Uruguay of 1997